Rosin Jolly (born 1 October 1988) is a television presenter and an actress in Malayalam cinema.

Early life
Jolly is from Kerala. She was born in Muvattupuzha in the Ernakulam district of the Indian state of Kerala. She completed secondary and college degrees in Bengaluru and is settled there.

Career
Rosin Jolly started her as a dancer and a Television Host in 2011. She anchored shows such as Wedding Bells, Priyasakhi, Love in Canopy, SIIMA film Awards 2014 and Atham Pathu Ruchi.

She acted in two films in 2012 and five films during 2013. In addition to her movie roles, Jolly was a contestant on Malayalee House, a reality show that aired on Surya TV in 2013.She has also acted in many TV advertisements like Skie Ice Cream, Zee Kannada, White Soap, Kanyaka Magazine, Kaumudy TV, Kerala Matrimony, M Factory Media,Agni TMT,Uathayam,Britannia,Dalmina Cements,Deep Rooted,Amazon Great Indian Festival, Urban Company and Asian Paints. Thamarakannan, Sreeramajapam, Sree Bhadrakali, and Indian Brazuca are her popular albums.

Television

Filmography

References

External links
 

Living people
21st-century Indian actresses
Indian film actresses
Actresses in Malayalam cinema
Indian television actresses
Female models from Kerala
1988 births